Ramona Sakiestewa (born 1948) is a contemporary Hopi Native American artist who lives and works in Santa Fe, New Mexico. Sakiestewa is renowned for her tapestries, works on paper, public art, and architectural installations.

Early life and education
Sakiestewa was born in Albuquerque, NM to a Hopi father and German-English-Irish mother. She studied at Verde Valley School Sedona, Arizona, Santa Fe Prep, Santa Fe, NM. To further her understanding of design and color, Sakiestewa traveled to New York City in the late 1960s to study at the School of Visual Arts. She then returned to the Southwest, where she took a job as an arts administrator at Santa Fe's Museum of New Mexico.

Career

Early career 
Sakiestewa is a self-taught weaver using prehistoric Pueblo techniques from the American Southwest. Her early work employed hand spun and hand dyed yarns. She researched native plant dyes of the Americas along with developing and reproducing cochineal and indigo dyeing techniques. She adapted traditional upright continuous warp weaving methods to horizontal floor loom weaving. In 1981 Sakiestewa opened her weaving studio, Ramona Sakiestewa Ltd., weaving one-of-a-kind tapestries full-time.

Sakiestewa’s earliest weavings were simple banded floor rugs in the classic Pueblo style with a contemporary palette. She taught herself by reading books and with the help of a few generous acquaintances. She mastered techniques for dyeing yarn and began showing her work at Santa Fe Indian Market. Sakiestewa’s preferred tapestry size was 50” x 70” inches. Her imagery remains abstract—the style that comes most naturally, she says, and captures the essence of her subject, whether inspired by ritual objects, ceremony, or the landscape of the Southwest.

”(Sakiestewa) has pressed issues of scale, texture, color and tone in works that shatter old barriers separating weaving, painting and mixed media.” - Ann Lane Hedlund

In the late 1980s Sakiestewa wove thirteen tapestries from the drawings of Frank Lloyd Wright for the Frank Lloyd Wright  Foundation, Phoenix, AZ. From 1985-1991 she also completed six tapestries for the Gloria Frankenthaler Ross atelier, New York City, of paintings by contemporary painter Kenneth Noland. Sakiestewa was commissioned to design a series of limited edition blankets for  Dewey Trading Company, woven by Pendleton Blankets, Pendleton, OR; and a limited edition, “Ancient Blanket Series”, woven by Scalamandre, Long Island City, NY.

Architecture and design 
In 1994 Sakiestewa was invited to join the architectural design team for the National Museum of the American Indian, Smithsonian Mall Museum, Washington, DC. A 10-year project, Sakiestewa created a design vocabulary for the project and collaboratively designed architectural elements for the museum that opened September 21, 2004. Design features included the building’s main entry doors, the Entry Plaza Birthdate, a 100-foot copper screen wall, a 60-foot wide theater curtain, and other architectural elements throughout the building. She authored the contributing essay, "Making Our World Understandable" in the companion book, Spirit of a Native Place: Building the National Museum of the American Indian.

In 2009 Sakiestewa closed her weaving studio to further develop her works-on-paper and painting and architectural projects. Continuing her work with architects Sakiestewa designed architectural elements for the Tempe Center for the Performing Arts, Tempe, Arizona (2002–07); the Kurdistan Regional Government project, Erbil, Iraq (2008–11); the Chickasaw Cultural Center, Ada, Oklahoma (2002–04); and the Komatke Health Center, Gila, Arizona (2006–07).

Sakiestewa's experience with public art and her expertise in Native American culture has developed into her being a sought-after advisor for national and international cultural projects. She worked as a design consultant for the observatory and astronomy center for the University of New Mexico.

Arts advocacy 
In 1980, Sakiestewa became the first Native American woman to lead the Southwestern Association for Indian Arts (SWAIA), the nonprofit that hosts the annual Santa Fe Indian Market.

Sakiestewa served in the position of chair of the New Mexico Arts Commission]; trustee of the International Folk Art Foundation, Santa Fe; member of the National Park Service Concessions Management Advisory Board, Washington, DC, an appointment by the US Secretary of the Interior; member of the New Mexico Coin Commission, Santa Fe, a gubernatorial appointment; trustee of the Georgia O’Keeffe Museum in Santa Fe.

Awards 
Sakiestewa has received numerous awards for her artwork, including the New Mexico Governor’s Award for Excellence in the Arts (2006), the Governor’s Outstanding New Mexico Woman’s Award (2006), induction into New Mexico Women’s Hall of Fame (2006), the New Mexico Committee of the National Museum of Women in the Arts (2007); and a selected artist for Gift to the Nation, Friends of Art and Preservation in Embassies, Washington DC (2001). She received awards within the Contemporary Weaving division, Santa Fe Indian Market (1982-1991).

Personal life 
In 1978 Ramona married poet Arthur Sze. They have one son Micah F.H. Sakiestewa Sze (b. 1979) In 1998 Ramona married architect/exhibit designer Andrew F. Merriell.

Selected Museum Collections and Exhibitions 
 National Museum of American History, Smithsonian Institution, Washington, DC
 New Mexico Museum of Art Santa Fe, NM
 Heard Museum, Phoenix, AZ
 Saint Louis Art Museum, St. Louis, MO
 Denver Art Museum, Denver, CO
 Mint Museum of Craft + Design, Charlotte, NC
 Albuquerque Museum of Art and History, Albuquerque, NM
 Wheelwright Museum of the American Indian, Santa Fe, NM
 University of Pennsylvania Museum of Archaeology and Anthropology, Philadelphia, PA
Hearts of our People: Native Women Artists, an exhibition organized by the Minneapolis Institute of Art, Minneapolis, MN

References

Further reading 
 McCoy, Ron. Ramona Sakiestewa, 35th Anniversary Issue, American Indian Art Magazine, Winter 2010
 Heppenheimer, Jill. Giving Voice to Creativity, Fiberarts Magazine, 2007
 Newman, Dana/Parsons, Jack. New Mexico Artists at Work, Museum of New Mexico Press, Santa Fe, NM, p. 129 -131, 2005
 Jacka, Lois and Jerry, Beyond Tradition, Contemporary Indian Art and Its Evolution, Northland Publishing Company, Flagstaff, AZ, p. 130-131, 1988

Artists from New Mexico
1948 births
Living people
Native American artists
American women artists
School of Visual Arts alumni
Tapestry artists
Native American women artists
Women textile artists
20th-century Native American women
20th-century Native Americans
21st-century Native American women
21st-century Native Americans
20th-century American women artists
American textile artists
21st-century American women artists